Rhytidocaulon is a plant genus in the family Apocynaceae, first described in 1962. It is native to northeastern Africa and the Arabian Peninsula

Species
Species accepted by the Plants of the World Online as of February 2023: 
Rhytidocaulon arachnoideum 
Rhytidocaulon baricum 
Rhytidocaulon ciliatum 
Rhytidocaulon elegantissimum 
Rhytidocaulon fulleri 
Rhytidocaulon macrolobum 
Rhytidocaulon mccoyi 
Rhytidocaulon molamatarense 
Rhytidocaulon paradoxum  - Ethiopia
Rhytidocaulon piliferum  - Somalia
Rhytidocaulon pseudosubscandens 
Rhytidocaulon richardianum  - Somalia
Rhytidocaulon sheilae 
Rhytidocaulon specksii 
Rhytidocaulon splendidum 
Rhytidocaulon subscandens  - Somalia, Ethiopia
Rhytidocaulon tortum  - Arabia

Taxonomy 
Phylogenetic studies have shown the genus to be monophyletic, and most closely related to the genus Echidnopsis which inhabits the same region. Marginally more distantly related is a sister branch comprising the genus Pseudolithos and the widespread Caralluma stapeliads of North Africa.

References

Apocynaceae genera
Asclepiadoideae